The 2018 WNBA season was the 19th season for the Seattle Storm of the Women's National Basketball Association. The regular season began May 20th and ended on August 19th.

The Storm started the season strongly posting a 5–1 record in May.  Their only loss came in the opening game of the season against the Phoenix Mercury.  The storm had their worst month of the season in June, going 6–4.  The team couldn't string together a run of wins, alternating between winning 2 and losing one.  The team found their stride in July with a strong 9–2 record.  The month started with a 4 game winning streak, and the team won 7 of its first 8.  The only losses in July came in over time to Los Angeles and to eventual #2 playoff seed Atlanta.  August was another good month for the Storm.  The team went 6–1 in the month, with their only loss being at eventual #3 playoff seed Washington.  The team's final record of 26–8 was their best since 2010.  This record earned them the #1 seed in the 2018 WNBA Playoffs and a bye into the Semifinals.

The Storm faced off against the #5 seed Phoenix Mercury in the Semifinals.  The series was a hotly contested series, with both teams making large runs in individual games.  Eventually the home team won each game in the series, which meant the Storm advanced 3–2.  In the WNBA Finals, the Storm swept the Washington Mystics in three games, securing the third championship in franchise history.

Transactions

WNBA Draft

Trades and roster changes

Roster

Game log

Preseason 

|- style="background:#bbffbb;"
| 1
| May 8
| Phoenix
| W 73–69
| 3 Tied (15)
| Howard (6)
| Tied (3)
| KeyArena3,502
| 1–0
|- style="background:#bbffbb;"
| 2
| May 12
| Phoenix
| W 84–61
| Canada (17)
| Stewart (8)
| Bird (5)
| Talking Stick Resort Arena4,535
| 2–0

Regular season

|- style="background:#fcc;"
| 1
| May 20
| Phoenix
| L 82–87
| Stewart (22)
| Stewart (15)
| Bird (5)
| KeyArena8,602
| 0–1
|- style="background:#bbffbb;"
| 2
| May 23
| @ Phoenix
| W 87–71
| Loyd (29)
| Stewart (11)
| Bird (5)
| Talking Stick Resort Arena8,068
| 1–1
|- style="background:#bbffbb;"
| 3
| May 25
| Chicago
| W 95–91
| Loyd (29)
| Howard (10)
| Bird (9)
| KeyArena5,866
| 2–1
|- style="background:#bbffbb;"
| 4
| May 27
| @ Las Vegas
| W 105–98
| Stewart (23)
| Stewart (9)
| Loyd (9)
| Mandalay Bay Events Center7,662
| 3–1
|- style="background:#bbffbb;"
| 5
| May 29
| Washington
| W 81–77
| Loyd (27)
| Loyd (8)
| Bird (7)
| KeyArena4,453
| 4–1
|- style="background:#bbffbb;"
| 6
| May 31
| Las Vegas
| W 101–74
| Stewart (21)
| Russell (8)
| Bird (9)
| KeyArena5,235
| 5–1

|- style="background:#fcc;"
| 7
| June 2
| @ Dallas
| L 90–94
| Stewart (28)
| Howard (9)
| Canada (9)
| College Park Center5,191
| 5–2
|- style="background:#bbffbb;"
| 8
| June 7
| @ Los Angeles
| W 88–63
| Clark (17)
| Howard (9)
| Bird (8)
| Staples Center9,204
| 6–2
|- style="background:#fcc;"
| 9
| June 10
| Atlanta
| L 64–67
| Howard (15)
| Howard (15)
| Tied (3)
| KeyArena6,345
| 6–3
|- style="background:#bbffbb;"
| 10
| June 12
| Chicago
| W 96–85
| Stewart (30)
| Paris (8)
| Tied (5)
| KeyArena4,353
| 7–3
|- style="background:#bbffbb;"
| 11
| June 15
| Connecticut
| W 103–92
| Howard (25)
| Stewart (9)
| Tied (5)
| KeyArena7,094
| 8–3
|- style="background:#fcc;"
| 12
| June 19
| Las Vegas
| L 77–87
| Stewart (27)
| Tied (8)
| Loyd (7)
| KeyArena6,395
| 8–4
|- style="background:#bbffbb;"
| 13
| June 22
| Indiana
| W 72–63
| Loyd (25)
| Howard (9)
| Bird (7)
| KeyArena8,142
| 9–4
|- style="background:#bbffbb;"
| 14
| June 24
| @ Dallas
| W 97–76
| Stewart (28)
| Stewart (12)
| Bird (10)
| College Park Center4,084
| 10–4
|- style="background:#fcc;"
| 15
| June 26
| @ Minnesota
| L 79–91
| Stewart (27)
| Paris (8)
| Bird (9)
| Target Center8,634
| 10–5
|- style="background:#bbffbb;"
| 16
| June 28
| Los Angeles
| W 81–72
| Stewart (27)
| 3 Tied (8)
| Bird (11)
| KeyArena8,447
| 11–5

|- style="background:#bbffbb;"
| 17
| July 1
| Connecticut
| W 84–70
| Howard (13)
| Howard (8)
| Bird (9)
| KeyArena9,307
| 12–5
|- style="background:#bbffbb;"
| 18
| July 3
| @ New York
| W 77–62
| Tied (21)
| Stewart (8)
| Bird (11)
| Westchester County Center1,749
| 13–5
|- style="background:#bbffbb;"
| 19
| July 6
| @ Atlanta
| W 95–86
| Stewart (29)
| Howard (11)
| Bird (10)
| McCamish Pavilion3,935
| 14–5
|- style="background:#bbffbb;"
| 20
| July 8
| Washington
| W 97–91
| Stewart (25)
| Stewart (10)
| Bird (5)
| KeyArena8,724
| 15–5
|- style="background:#fcc;"
| 21
| July 10
| Los Angeles
| L 75–77 (OT)
| Howard (18)
| Stewart (13)
| Bird (8)
| KeyArena9,686
| 15–6
|- style="background:#bbffbb;"
| 22
| July 14
| Dallas
| W 91–84
| Stewart (35)
| Stewart (10)
| Loyd (6)
| KeyArena9,686
| 16–6
|- style="background:#bbffbb;"
| 23
| July 18
| @ Chicago
| W 101–83
| Stewart (30)
| Loyd (10)
| Bird (11)
| Wintrust Arena10,024
| 17–6
|- style="background:#bbffbb;"
| 24
| July 20
| @ Connecticut
| W 78–65
| Loyd (31)
| Tied (6)
| Bird (5)
| Mohegan Sun Arena7,908
| 18–6
|- style="background:#fcc;"
| 25
| July 22
| @ Atlanta
| L 74–87
| Stewart (31)
| Stewart (8)
| Bird (6)
| McCamish Pavilion4,916
| 18–7
|- style="background:#bbffbb;"
| 26
| July 24
| @ Indiana
| W 92–72
| Stewart (26)
| Stewart (10)
| Bird (11)
| Bankers Life Fieldhouse5,908
| 19–7
|- style="background:#bbffbb;"
| 27
| July 31
| @ Phoenix
| W 102–91
| Loyd (29)
| Howard (10)
| Bird (5)
| Talking Stick Resort Arena10,005
| 20–7

|- style="background:#bbffbb;"
| 28
| August 3
| Minnesota
| W 85–75
| Stewart (20)
| Stewart (7)
| Bird (11)
| KeyArena12,064
| 21-7
|- style="background:#bbffbb;"
| 29
| August 6
| @ New York
| W 96–80
| Stewart (32)
| Howard (10)
| Tied (7)
| Madison Square Garden12,488
| 22-7
|- style="background:#bbffbb;"
| 30
| August 7
| @ Indiana
| W 94–79
| Howard (19)
| Stewart (12)
| Tied (8)
| Bankers Life Fieldhouse6,401
| 23-7
|- style="background:#fcc;"
| 31
| August 9
| @ Washington
| L 77–100
| Tied (15)
| Langhorne (5)
| 3 Tied (4)
| Capital One Arena6,808
| 23-8
|- style="background:#bbffbb;"
| 32
| August 12
| @ Minnesota
| W 81–72
| Howard (21)
| Stewart (17)
| Loyd (6)
| Target Center9,123
| 24-8
|- style="background:#bbffbb;"
| 33
| August 17
| New York
| W 85–77
| Stewart (22)
| Stewart (15)
| Bird (6)
| KeyArena10,873
| 25-8
|- style="background:#bbffbb;"
| 34
| August 19
| Dallas
| W 84–68
| Tied (15)
| Russell (9)
| Canada (5)
| KeyArena12,574
| 26-8

Playoffs

|- style="background:#bbffbb;"
| 1
| August 26
| Phoenix
| W 91–87
| Stewart (28)
| Stewart (7)
| Bird (10)
| KeyArena9,686
| 1–0
|- style="background:#bbffbb;"
| 2
| August 28
| Phoenix
| W 91–87 (OT)
| Stewart (27)
| Langhorne (10)
| Bird (6)
| KeyArena9,686
| 2–0
|- style="background:#fcc;"
| 3
| August 31
| @ Phoenix
| L 66–86
| Howard (19)
| Stewart (11)
| Bird (11)
| Talking Stick Resort Arena15,185
| 2-1
|-style="background:#fcc;"
| 4
| September 2
| @ Phoenix
| L 84–86
| Stewart (22)
| Bird (9)
| Bird (7)
| Talking Stick Resort Arena8,137
| 2–2
|-style="background:#bbffbb;"
| 5
| September 4
| Phoenix
| W 94–84
| Stewart (28)
| Clark (13)
| Bird (5)
| KeyArena8,992
| 3–2

|- style="background:#bbffbb"
| 1
| September 7
| Washington
| W 89–76
| Loyd (23)
| Clark, Howard, Loyd (5)
| Bird (7)
| KeyArena11,486
| 1–0
|- style="background:#bbffbb"
| 2
| September 9
| Washington
| W 75–73
| Stewart (19)
| Howard (11)
| Bird (4)
| KeyArena14,212
| 2–0
|- style="background:#bbffbb"
| 3
| September 12
| @ Washington
| W 98–82
| Stewart (30)
| Howard (14)
| Bird (10)
| EagleBank Arena9,164
| 3–0

Awards and honors

Standings

Playoffs

Statistics

Regular season

References

External links
THE OFFICIAL SITE OF THE SEATTLE STORM

Seattle Storm seasons
Seattle
2018 in sports in Washington (state)
Storm
Women's National Basketball Association championship seasons